This is a list of the presidents of the College of William & Mary in Virginia, a public university located in Williamsburg, Virginia.

References

 
College of William and Mary presidents
William And Mary